Refuge de Tré la Tête is a refuge in the Mont Blanc massif in the Alps.

Mountain huts in the Alps
Mountain huts in France